Harold James Jarman (born 4 May 1939) is an English former professional footballer and first-class cricketer. He spent the majority of his lengthy footballing career with Bristol Rovers, where he is the club's 3rd-highest goalscorer of all time and was inducted into their Hall of Fame in April 2021. 

He also had a single season with each of Newport County and New York Cosmos, as well as representing several non-league football clubs, including Bristol St George, Chippenham United, Mangotsfield United, and Portway Bristol where he was player-manager. 

After ending his playing career he remained in football, most notably as manager of Bristol Rovers, Bath City and Mangotsfield United. He also held a number of coaching and scouting positions, including roles at Blackburn Rovers and Norwich City.

While he is primarily known as a footballer, he also played professional cricket in the summers throughout the 1960s, up until 1971, for Gloucestershire County Cricket Club, representing the county at both first-class and List A levels.

Early life
Harold Jarman was born on 4 May 1939 in the Cliftonwood area of Bristol to parents William and Catherine Jarman (née Harris). Just months after Harold's birth his father contracted a viral infection that left him permanently blinded and unable to work, meaning Harold's mother had to take a number of jobs throughout his childhood as well as care for her family and husband.

He began attending Hotwells Primary School from 1944, Hotwells being a short walk from the family home, then went to Penpole School in Shirehampton for a year in 1950 before moving to the nearby Portway Boys' School in 1951. He only remained at Portway school for a year,  and in 1952 he moved school again when he passed the entrance exam for the Bristol Technical School (Building) in the Barton Hill area of Bristol.

During his childhood Jarman showed an aptitude for both cricket and football, representing his primary school in both sports. Between the ages of 13 and 16 he took part in coaching sessions for talented local cricketers organised by the Bristol Evening Post newspaper, with the sessions led by Gloucestershire player Len Harbin. He was also selected for the Bristol Boys cricket team, captaining the side for two years, but although he showed a similar talent for football he was never chosen to join the Bristol Boys football team as he was considered too small for the more physical game.

Footballing career

As a player

Amateur football
Jarman's debut in senior football came in 1953, when still aged only 14 he turned out for Clifton Villa Reserves in the Bristol Downs League. He made an immediate impact in the team, scoring four goals in an 11–1 victory. By the time he was 16 he was playing regularly in the Clifton Villa first team alongside his brother, Bill Jarman. After a trial with West Bromwich Albion in 1955, Harold joined Chippenham United in 1956, and played a single match for Bristol St George in 1958 before joining Victoria Athletic in the Bristol Premier Combination. Jarman had built up a strong reputation in the local footballing community and this was recognised by Bristol Rovers, who signed him on 7 August 1959.

Bristol Rovers
After signing for Bristol Rovers in the summer, Jarman made his first team debut on Boxing Day 1959 in a Football League Second Division match against Swansea Town. Rovers won the game 3–1, thanks to two goals from Alfie Biggs and one from Geoff Bradford in front of a crowd of 16,501 at Eastville Stadium. 

Jarman earned himself a place in the Pirates history books in just his second season with the club, on 26 September 1960, when he scored Bristol Rovers' first ever goal in the  Football League Cup. Rovers had the honour of participating in the first game ever played in the competition when they faced First Division side Fulham in the opening round of the 1960–61 tournament. Maurice Cook had given Fulham the lead in the 9th minute, scoring the first ever goal in the competition, but Jarman equalised seventeen minutes later to seal his place in Rovers folklore. Geoff Bradford added a second goal for Rovers later on, giving them a shock victory over their top-flight opponents.

Throughout the 1960s Jarman was a firm favourite with the Eastville Stadium crowd and the chant "Harold, Harold" was regularly heard echoing around the ground.

To celebrate the landmark of his 500th appearance for Bristol Rovers, Jarman was handed the captain's armband for a Division Three match against Tranmere Rovers on 13 January 1973. Bristol Rovers won the match 2–0, but the occasion was overshadowed by a serious injury to their goalkeeper Dick Sheppard who was carried off by ambulancemen following a collision with Tranmere's Eddie Loyden during the first half. After this the game became a bad tempered affair with the Rovers players aggrieved that Loyden hadn't been sent off, leading to numerous heavy tackles and confrontations between the two teams. It was later revealed that Sheppard had suffered a depressed fracture of the skull in the game, effectively ending his professional career.

By the time he finally left the Pirates Jarman had started 440 Football League matches, and made a further twelve appearances as a substitute, scoring 127 goals. He has made the sixth-highest number of League appearances of anyone who has played for the club, and is the third highest scorer in the club's history.

Newport County
Jarman left Bristol Rovers on 14 May 1973 and made the short move across the Severn Bridge to join Newport County, along with teammate Brian Godfrey who also made the same move. That summer Jarman played against Bristol Rovers for his new club in a pre-season friendly. He was on the scoresheet in a 2–2 draw that also saw some fighting break out amongst the two sets of supporters. 

In December 1973 Jarman was in the Newport side that faced Torquay United in a Division Four match at Plainmoor. In goal for the Devon side that day was Jarman's friend and former teammate Dick Sheppard, who was on loan from Bristol Rovers and attempting to make a comeback after being so seriously injured eleven months earlier in Jarman's 500th match. Late in the game Sheppard conceded a penalty, which Jarman stepped up to take and scored. The goal was little more than a consolation for Newport however as they still lost 3–2. This was one of only two appearances Sheppard made for Torquay, and he would go on to play one more time for Rovers before finally retiring from professional football.

At the end of the 1973–74 season though Jarman was deemed surplus to requirements at Newport and was told he could leave on a free transfer. At this point, prior to the 1995 Bosman ruling, players did not have to be released at the end of their contracts so Newport could have demanded a transfer fee for him if they felt he had any value and if they had wanted to do so.

After leaving Newport Jarman wouldn't play in the Football League again. Over the course of his career he made a total of 474 Football League appearances, plus a further 18 from the substitute's bench, scoring 135 goals in a fourteen-year period between 1959 and 1973.

New York and non-league
In 1974, Gordon Bradley, manager of the New York Cosmos, brought Jarman into the team to replace young American striker Joey Fink who had scored eleven goals in fourteen games in 1973. Although initially enthusiastic about his move across the Atlantic Ocean Jarman grew increasingly homesick, being separated from his young family who had remained in Bristol. He produced only four goals in eighteen games before he was released and returned to his home city.

By this point Jarman had grown disillusioned with professional football and had decided that he wouldn't try to find a new League club in England. Instead he was persuaded to join Mangotsfield United by his former Bristol Rovers teammate Doug Hillard, who was now manager of the Mangos. By September 1974 he had received international clearance and was in the Mangotsfield side.

As a manager

Jarman's fist step into football management came in 1976, when he was appointed player-manager of Portway Bristol for their debut season in Division One of the Western Football League. One of his first signings for the club after being appointed was his old friend, goalkeeper Dick Sheppard, who by now had retired from professional football. Jarman spent two years in charge of Portway Bristol, finishing in eighth place in the league during the 1976–77 season and seventh in 1977–78.

After four years out of the professional game, during which time he had been working as a carpenter, Jarman decided that he wanted to get back into full-time football and in February 1978 he successfully applied for the position of youth team coach at Bristol Rovers, replacing Colin Dobson who had recently vacated the position to join Coventry City. Jarman formed a strong working relationship with the Pirates' youth liaison officer Gordon Bennett, recruiting many talented young footballers to the club. Under Jarman's leadership the Rovers youth team had their most successful period up to that point, finding success in both league and cup competitions. During his spell in charge they achieved their highest league position, progressed further than ever before in the FA Youth Cup, and twice won a prestigious international youth tournament in Tilburg, Netherlands.

On 13 December 1979 the Bristol Rovers' first team manager, Scotsman Bobby Campbell, was relieved of his duties following a poor run of results which had left the club near the bottom of the Division Two league table. The club appointed Jarman as caretaker manager while the vacant position was advertised and applicants were interviewed. During this spell the first team's performance improved and Jarman was rewarded by being given the job on a full-time basis.

The team's improvement in form continued until the end of the 1979–80 season, and they eventually finished six points clear of the relegation zone. One of Jarman's first actions as manager was to re-appoint Terry Cooper to the coaching staff. Cooper had been sacked a few months earlier by Jarman's predecessor, but the decision to bring him back to the club backfired on Jarman when the Bristol Rovers board opted to replace Jarman as manager with Cooper almost as soon as the season ended. Cooper initially kept Jarman on as his assistant manager, but fired him on 22 September 1980, along with Bobby Campbell who was by this point the club's chief scout, in order to bring in his own coaching team.

He subsequently held various coaching and scouting positions at a number of clubs including Norwich City (where he was appointed by his former colleague Gordon Bennett), Blackburn Rovers and Manchester City, and he managed both Bath City and Mangotsfield United.

Cricketing career

Jarman made his debut for the Gloucestershire first eleven on 8 July 1961 in a County Championship match against Middlesex at the Wagon Works Ground in Gloucester. Batting at number 7 in the first innings he ended on 22 not out as Gloucestershire were dismissed for 144. Coincidentally, batting at number 8 in that lineup was wicket-keeper Barrie Meyer, another dual-sport professional who like Jarman also played football for Bristol Rovers. Jarman didn't bat in the second innings as Gloucestershire declared at 432–6 before going on to lose the match by one wicket.

He went on to play an average of about four games a season in the County Championship over an eleven-year spell, eventually making his final first class appearance against Yorkshire at Bramall Lane on 17–20 July 1971. In his last match he scored 13 not out in the first innings when Gloucestershire declared on 276–9 and scored 1 not out in the second innings, with Gloucestershire winning the match by four wickets. Overall he played 45 first-class matches between 1961 and 1971, scoring 1041 runs and making three half centuries. He also bowled 39.1 overs without taking any wickets and allowing 131 runs.

Career statistics

Football

Cricket

Notes

References

Bibliography

1939 births
Living people
Cricketers from Bristol
English footballers
Association football midfielders
Chippenham United F.C. players
Roman Glass St George F.C. players
Bristol Rovers F.C. players
Newport County A.F.C. players
New York Cosmos players
Mangotsfield United F.C. players
Portway Bristol F.C. players
Portway Bristol F.C. managers
Bristol Rovers F.C. managers
Bath City F.C. managers
Mangotsfield United F.C. managers
English cricketers
Gloucestershire cricketers
North American Soccer League (1968–1984) players
Blackburn Rovers F.C. non-playing staff
Norwich City F.C. non-playing staff
Manchester City F.C. non-playing staff
Footballers from Bristol
English expatriate sportspeople in the United States
Expatriate soccer players in the United States
English expatriate footballers
English football managers